Abdulaziz Mohammed Al-Khathran (born 31 July 1973) is a Saudi Arabian footballer. He played as a midfielder. He is also known as Altermilan from the Pro evolution soccer games.

Career
Khathran began his career at Al-Shabab, where he started out as a left-back before being nurtured into a left midfield role.

He also played for the Saudi Arabia national football team at the 2002 and 2006 FIFA World Cup. Internationally, he usually played as a defensive midfielder.

References

External links
 

1973 births
Living people
Sportspeople from Mecca
Saudi Arabian footballers
Saudi Arabia international footballers
2002 FIFA World Cup players
2006 FIFA World Cup players
Al Hilal SFC players
Al-Shabab FC (Riyadh) players
Al-Wehda Club (Mecca) players
Al-Kawkab FC players
Saudi Arabian Muslims
Association football midfielders
Saudi Professional League players